The Mayor of Newham is a directly elected mayor responsible for the executive function of Newham London Borough Council in east London, England. The position is different from the previously existing (and largely ceremonial) annually appointed mayors of Newham, known as 'Civic Ambassador' from 2002 until the office was discontinued in 2009. The inaugural holder of the post, created on 2 May 2002, was Robin Wales - who held the position for five terms between 2002-2018. Wales was deselected as the candidate for Labour in the 2018 election, which led to the election of Rokhsana Fiaz as mayor, after Labour held Newham in the mayoral and local council elections.

A referendum on the governance of the council was held on the 6 May 2021, in which local electors voted for the continuation of the current mayoral system as the executive of the council (described as the "Mayor and Cabinet" model) over its replacement with a councillor-led committee model of governance, which would have seen the position of mayoralty being scrapped.

Referendum

Elections

2002

2006

2010

2014

2018
Wales was deselected ahead of the 2018 election.

2022

References

Newham